Frankenia pulverulenta, the European seaheath, is a species of annual herb in the family Frankeniaceae. They have a self-supporting growth form and simple, broad leaves. Individuals can grow to 5 cm tall.

Sources

References 

pulverulenta
Flora of Malta